is a Japanese manga series written and illustrated by Nakaba Suzuki. The manga was serialized in Shogakukan's Weekly Shōnen Sunday from October 2007 to March 2010, with its chapters collected in twelve tankōbon volumes. The series was re-launched by Kodansha in six shinsōban volumes.

Plot 
Akira Kongō is looking to take down the "23 District Project", which involves banchōs from twenty-three districts of Tokyo fighting for the right to control Japan. Without meaning to, he becomes a participant with the alias "Kongō Banchō", and must take down other banchōs while searching for the leaders of the project.

Characters

A large man with an even larger heart, Akira remains calm and only loses his cool when his friends are hurt. When he speaks most people cannot help but feel overwhelmed and see the error of their ways. He saved Hinako from Kiriu Tōya and became the banchō of Chiyoda district. He helps the little guy and does not care about being powerful or rich. Besides his desire to destroy the District Plan he seems happy just enjoying the simple things. He goes to Raimei Senior High School, and follows what he calls simple logic; someone hurts your friend, you hurt them back. Besides his fighting knowledge and schoolwork Akira is not very knowledgeable of technology. As his size shows he has superhuman strength and can harden the muscles in his fists to make them as strong as Lead. His strength and massive build makes delicate work hard for him. Besides taking down other banchōs, Akira also helps those in his district with their problems.

Classmate and friend of Akira. When Akira first told her about the District Plan she laughed and reported to a cop, said cop was in on the plan and captured her, after which Akira fought to saved her and became friends. She has a little sister named Tsukimi.

He has a bishōnen appearance and seems very cultured and calm. He is defeated by Akira, and after that, Akira has taken Tōya's place as the district's banchō. Tōya eventually joins Akira, believing that he has what it takes to be the winner of the District Project and is willing to die to help him succeed.

The  (cowardly banchō). His catchphrase is "let's fight in a fair, cowardly way." He uses any means necessary to win; he has no compunction about resorting to lies, sneak attacks or kidnapping. He was defeated by Akira, and joins him after he saved him and his underling (one of his little brothers). His reason for helping Akira is so that Akira will be indebted to help him when needed and he plans to backstab Akira when he wins control over all the districts. Actually, Yū is thankful to Akira, who helped save Yuu's family even if he tried to kill him.

The . She appears to be a sweet young tomboyish-looking girl. She comes from a very rich family and despite her petit size she can eat an entire Chankonabe by herself, this is due to her body's "hyperion constitution" (a rare medical condition that makes her muscle a dozen times denser, more flexible and her organs can keep up with it, with the drawback being a super increased metabolism). She fancies herself a warrior of justice and went around destroying areas of her district that she considered evil or that were used by those who are evil. She tried to destroy a chemical plant since it was polluting the air without thinking about the hazardous chemicals she could release onto the surrounding area. Akira stopped her during a fight, showing her that she was acting without any forethought. After her defeat, she learns from her actions and becomes friends with him.

Acting like a Buddha, he brainwashed all the students in Kōji Senior High to be his acolytes in his cult. He seems to be greedy and narcissistic, since he had his followers buy and sell lots of merchandise with his image on it, like keychains and T-shirts. He seems to have the power to blast anyone and move while sitting with some kind of psychic force, but it is shown to be a trick when Akira sees Raionji use it underwater. His power is his abnormally large sized diaphragm that he keeps covered with his coat, allowing him superhuman breath. Akira defeats him and loses his followers (who believe Akira to be the reincarnation of Acala). He later joins Akira, reasoning that since Akira took on his 1000 followers to avenge just one friend, he now truly believes in Buddha, and he fully believes that Akira is the reincarnation of Acala.

The . She is the former 2nd generation leader of the all-female motorcycle gang "Red Scorpio". The first generation leader who took her in as a mentor, was Aiko Tsukishima, the late wife of Takeshi Kongō (Akira's brother) and mother of Rai Kongō (Takeshi's son and Akira's nephew). After her death, Haruka has taken in Rai as some sort of adoptive son and has sworn to get revenge on Takeshi. Due to the similarity between Akira and Takeshi, she mistakes the former for the latter and mercilessly goes after him. During her fight with Akira, she was shown that she was attacking the wrong guy, and agreed to share information in order to find Takeshi. She appears to have a crush on Yū Akiyama, whom she does not know is Hikyō banchō.

The . Takeshi is Akira's older brother and has been a competitor in the 23 Districts Project his father established from the very start. However, he has only recently shown to become active after Akira had interfered with the plans of the project and managed to conquer half of Tokyo's districts on his own. Takeshi has always been the stronger of the two brothers and moved up the ladder of success at an astonishing rate. After the efforts of the 23 Districts Project were crippled by Akira and forced to a standstill, Takeshi founded the Dark Student Council and changed the organisation's plans to a nationwide battle. Each banchō that manages to gain control over one of the remaining 46 prefectures outside of Tokyo is automatically appointed a seat in the Dark Student Council. Their plan is to destroy the civilization in Japan under Takeshi's lead and rebuild and restructure the country according to his will.

Media

Manga
Kongō Banchō, written and illustrated by Nakaba Suzuki. The manga was published in Shogakukan's Weekly Shōnen Sunday from October 24, 2007, to March 10, 2010. Shogakukan collected its chapters in twelve tankōbon volumes, released from February 18, 2008, to July 16, 2010. The series was re-launched by Kodansha in six shinsōban volumes, published from June 15 to August 17, 2018.

The manga was published in France by Kana.

Volume list

|}

New edition

|}

Other media
Characters of the series appeared in Weekly Shōnen Sunday and Weekly Shōnen Magazine crossover game  released for Nintendo DS in 2009.

References

External links
 Kongō Banchō at Web Sunday 

2007 manga
Action anime and manga
School life in anime and manga
Shōnen manga
Shogakukan manga